= Friedrich Gustav Arvelius =

Baltic German poet, lived in Estonia

Friedrich Gustav Arvelius (16/5 February 1753 – 25/13 July 1806) was a theologian, pedagogue, playwright and poet living in Estonia. He was of Finnish and Baltic-German origin. His pseudonym was Sembard.
